Another Day in the Death of America: A Chronicle of Ten Short Lives is a 2016 non-fiction book by the British journalist and writer Gary Younge. The book focuses on the stories of 10 American children and teenagers, ranging from the ages of 9 to 19, killed by gun violence within a 24-hour time period on November 23, 2013. The book follows the lives and deaths of Jaiden Dixon, Kenneth Mills-Tucker, Stanley Taylor, Pedro Cortez, Tyler Dunn, Edwin Rajo, Samuel Brightmon, Tyshon Anderson, Gary Anderson, and Gustin Hinnant.

Younge explores how the deaths are "normal" by American standards—in that none of the stories made national news—but not "normal" by civilized standards. The book was published by Nation Books.

Film Adaptation 
David Oyelowo is set to star in the film adaptation of the book. Currently, there is no release date on the film.

Reception 
Writing for The Guardian, Gillian Slovo wrote in her review, "The stories that Younge has uncovered are often sensational but he tells them without hyperbole and accompanies them with an analysis that lays bare the reality of being black and poor in America". Slovo finishes her review by writing, "Despite the composure of his writing, there is passion in Younge’s condemnation of a system that renders the poor and the dark in America invisible. In illuminating the stories of some of these people and of their communities, Younge has provided us with a beautifully told and empathic account that wrenches at the heart even as it continues to engage the brain."

References

External links
After Words interview with Gary Younger on Another Day in the Death of America, November 26, 2016

2016 non-fiction books
American non-fiction books
English-language books
Non-fiction crime books
Non-fiction books about murders in the United States
Gun violence in the United States
Non-fiction books adapted into films
Gun violence in popular culture
Nation Books books
Faber and Faber books
Works about gun politics in the United States